Timothy Michael Ream (born October 5, 1987) is an American professional soccer player who plays as a center-back or left-back for  club Fulham and the United States national team.

Youth and college soccer
Born in St. Louis, Missouri, Ream was a 2005 NSCAA All-Midwest Region selection with his high school, St. Dominic, and after finishing his career with 15 goals and a school-record 39 assists, was tabbed All-State, All-Conference and Class 2 Defensive Player of the Year in both 2004 and 2005, was a St. Louis Post-Dispatch All-Metro selection and garnered Archdiocesan Athletic Association Player of the Year honors following senior season. He helped lead St. Dominic to the 2004 Missouri Class 2 state title. Ream also played with academy club St. Louis Scott Gallagher, winning national championships in 2003 and 2004.

Ream attended Saint Louis University where he was a regular figure as a defender for the Saint Louis Billikens, earning NSCAA first-team All-Region and second-team All-Conference honors. During his college years Ream also played for Chicago Fire Premier in the USL Premier Development League.

Professional career

New York Red Bulls

Ream was drafted in the second round (18th overall) of the 2010 MLS SuperDraft by New York Red Bulls.  His play during pre-season impressed many observers, including new coach Hans Backe who was pleased with his distribution and tactical awareness.

On March 20, 2010, Ream started and played the full 90 minutes for Red Bulls in a 3–1 victory against Santos FC, which was the first match played at the new Red Bull Arena. He made his professional debut on March 27, 2010, playing the full 90 in New York's opening game of the 2010 MLS season against Chicago Fire that ended in a 1–0 victory for New York. On September 11, 2010, he scored his first professional goal (and MLS goal) against the Colorado Rapids in a 3–1 win for New York Red Bulls. Ream ended his first professional season starting all 30 matches for New York and helped New York capture its second regular season Eastern Conference title.
Upon the conclusion of the 2010 season, he was named the team's Defender of the Year, and he was one of three listed candidates for MLS Rookie of the Year.

During Ream's second season in New York, he played and started in 28 of 34 matches during the regular season; he missed 6 matches largely due to international call-ups during the 2011 CONCACAF Gold Cup.

In December 2011, during the MLS off-season, Ream spent a short time training with both West Bromwich Albion and Bolton Wanderers with permission from the Red Bulls to maintain his fitness during the winter break. At the beginning of January 2012, Bolton made a transfer offer of £2.5m for him. Bolton had recently sold Gary Cahill to Chelsea, and needed to find a replacement. The bid was accepted and after personal terms were agreed he received a work permit on January 24.

Bolton Wanderers

Bolton completed the signing of Ream on January 26, 2012, on a three-and-a-half-year contract. He canceled his honeymoon so that he could sign for Bolton. He was given the number 32 shirt and made his debut for the club in Bolton's 2–0 FA Cup win at Millwall on February 18. He made his Premier League debut the following weekend in Bolton's 3–0 defeat at Chelsea. On March 10, 2012, he assisted Darren Pratley's opening goal in a 2–1 win over Queens Park Rangers. He went on to appear ten games straight towards the end of the season, but was unable to help the club survive relegation in the Premier League.

For the start of the 2012–13 season, Ream was given the number 5 shirt, previously worn by Gary Cahill. He was given his first start of the 2012–13 season in a 2–0 loss against Burnley. However, he was sidelined from the first team, due to losing his starting place and was relegated to the substitutes bench. Despite this, Ream went on to make fifteen appearances.

Ahead of the 2013–14 season, Ream was linked with a move to Middlesbrough, a move that was denied by the club and Ream. After appearing the first three matches as an unused substitute, he started as defensive midfielder for four matches in September. In early February 2014, he was forced to wear a protective mask in Wanderers games after a collision with Queens Park Rangers striker Charlie Austin. Throughout the 2013–14 season, Ream played at left back and center back, where he established his partnership with Matt Mills and redeemed himself in the first team making 42 appearances. At the end of that season, he was voted the fans' player of the year and the club's player of the year.

Ahead of the 2014–15 season, on July 6, 2014, Ream signed a new three-year contract with Bolton that lasts until the summer of 2017. Over the course of the season, he made a total of 44 appearances, missing two matches, one as an unused substitute against Derby County on September 27, 2014 and one through injury. For the second season in a row, he was named as Bolton's player of the year.

Ahead of the 2015–16 season, Ream was linked with a move to Championship rivals Queens Park Rangers, who made a bid for him. However, the bid was rejected.

Fulham

On August 20, 2015, Ream was sold to Fulham, with whom he signed a four-year contract. The move had an undisclosed fee and an option to extend his stay by a further year.

He made his Fulham debut on August 29, 2015, in a 3–1 win over Rotherham United, playing 90 minutes. He made 29 appearances for the club in his first season, partly due to international commitment and injuries. After initially playing as a centre back, he was used at left back toward the end of the season, following the departure of James Husband. He scored his first goal for the club in a 2–1 loss against Queens Park Rangers on October 1, 2016.

Ream scored his first ever Premier League goal for Fulham on Boxing Day 2022 against Crystal Palace.

International career
On November 11, 2010, Ream was called up to the United States men's national soccer team for the first time as part of an 18-man roster for a match against South Africa on November 17 in Cape Town. He made his international debut against South Africa on November 17, 2010. He started the match and played until the 67th minute before being replaced by Nat Borchers. The U.S. won 1–0 with the lone goal coming from fellow Red Bull teammate Juan Agudelo. On January 22, 2011, he earned his second international cap against Chile in a 1–1 draw. He played all 90 minutes at center back.

Ream started in their first game of the 2011 Gold Cup, a 2–0 win over Canada. He also started the second match against Panama, which the U.S. lost 2–1 for their first ever loss in Gold Cup group play. In the 34th minute, he committed a foul on Blas Pérez resulting in a penalty kick for Panama. The penalty was converted by Gabriel Gómez and became the match-winner. In the next match, against Guadeloupe, he was replaced by Eric Lichaj and did not play in the final four matches of the 2011 Gold Cup.

After a two-year absence, Ream was again called into the U.S. national team in 2013 appearing as an unused substitute against Bosnia and Herzegovina on August 14, 2013. On September 3, 2014, he played his first international match in three years, playing 45 minutes in a 1–0 win over Czech Republic.

Ream also was called up for the 2015 Gold Cup where he played all 90 minutes against the Haiti national team and helped preserve a 1–0 clean sheet. He scored his first international goal on May 22, 2016, in a friendly against Puerto Rico at the Juan Ramón Loubriel Stadium in Bayamón, Puerto Rico.

On November 9, 2022, Ream was called up for the 2022 FIFA World Cup. He started all four games for the U.S. in Qatar, as the U.S. advanced to the Round of 16.

Personal life
In January 2012, Ream married his childhood sweetheart Kristen Sapienza, who is also a soccer player. Twenty-four hours after getting married Ream canceled his honeymoon planned in Tahiti to undergo a move to Bolton Wanderers. Ream later stated in The Bolton News interview that he still made a right choice in canceling his honeymoon.

Career statistics

Club

International

Scores and results list the United States' goal tally first.

Honors
Fulham
 EFL Championship: 2021–22
 EFL Championship play-offs: 2018, 2020

United States
 CONCACAF Nations League: 2020–21

Individual
 Bolton Wanderers Player of the Year: 2013–14, 2014–15
 Fulham Player of the Year: 2017–18
 PFA Team of the Year: 2021–22 Championship

References

External links

Profile at the Fulham F.C. website

1987 births
Living people
Soccer players from St. Louis
American soccer players
Association football defenders
Saint Louis University alumni
Saint Louis Billikens men's soccer players
Chicago Fire U-23 players
New York Red Bulls draft picks
New York Red Bulls players
Bolton Wanderers F.C. players
Fulham F.C. players
USL League Two players
Major League Soccer players
Major League Soccer All-Stars
Premier League players
English Football League players
United States men's international soccer players
2011 CONCACAF Gold Cup players
2015 CONCACAF Gold Cup players
2019 CONCACAF Gold Cup players
2022 FIFA World Cup players
American expatriate soccer players
Expatriate footballers in England
American expatriate sportspeople in England